The Divine Invasion is the third studio album by Electro Assassin, released on September 26, 1995 by Synthetic Symphony and Cyber-Tec Records.

Reception

AllMusic awarded The Divine Invasion three out of five possible stars. Sonic Boom said "the musical growth exhibited by Electro Assassin within the last several years has been nothing less than astonishing" and "They have forsaken the inane samples and pointless lyrics of previous albums and focused their new work entirely on a dark cyberculture concept which has become immensely popular recently."

Track listing

Personnel
Adapted from The Divine Invasion liner notes.

Electro Assassin
 Kevin Gould – instruments
 Richard McKinlay – instruments

Production and design
 Stef Michalski (Room237) – cover art, illustrations, design
 Zalman Fishman – executive-production

Release history

References

External links 
 
 The Divine Invasion at iTunes

1995 albums
Fifth Colvmn Records albums
Electro Assassin albums